UCPH may refer to:

 UCP2
 University of Copenhagen